WFGA (106.7 FM, "Real Country 106.7") is a commercial FM radio station licensed to Hicksville, Ohio. Owned by Swick Broadcasting Company, Inc., it broadcasts a classic country format. Its studios are located in Auburn, Indiana, and its transmitter is in Butler, Indiana.

History
The station began broadcasting on January 25, 2002 as WFJZ, with a satellite-fed smooth jazz format targeting the Fort Wayne market. Due to its poor signal in Fort Wayne proper, WFJZ was never very successful there, and on May 27, 2005, the station debuted an adult hits format and new call sign as WFGA, Froggy 106.7.

Construction of a new  tower was completed in Butler, Indiana in January 2010. The station subsequently moved its transmitter to the new facility on January 14, 2010, although it remains formally licensed to Hicksville.

In 2012, WFGA flipped to sports radio as a simulcast of WKJG's ESPN Radio programming.

In February 2018, Federated Media sold WFGA to Swick Broadcasting Company for $300,000. On May 22, 2018, after the completion of the sale, WFGA began stunting with barnyard sounds and snippets of country songs; the station officially flipped to classic country Real Country 106.7 on May 25.

References

External links

WFGA entry at Indiana Radio Watch

FGA
Radio stations established in 2002
2002 establishments in Ohio
Classic country radio stations in the United States